Ronei Gebing (born 22 February 1998), simply known as Ronei, is a Brazilian footballer who plays for Chapecoense as either a right back or a midfielder.

Club career
Ronei was born in Três Passos, Rio Grande do Sul, and joined Chapecoense's youth setup in 2015, from EC Encantado. He made his first team debut on 9 February 2017, coming on as a half-time substitute in a 0–2 away loss against Cruzeiro in the Primeira Liga.

Ronei subsequently returned to the youth sides until the 2019 campaign, when he was promoted to the main squad. He made his Série A debut on 4 December of that year, playing the last 15 minutes of a 3–0 home win against CSA.

In the 2020 campaign, Ronei became a regular starter under manager Umberto Louzer, and contributed with 23 league appearances as Chape returned to the top tier as champions.

Career statistics

Honours
Chapecoense
Campeonato Catarinense: 2020
Campeonato Brasileiro Série B: 2020

References

External links

1998 births
Living people
Sportspeople from Rio Grande do Sul
Brazilian footballers
Association football defenders
Association football midfielders
Campeonato Brasileiro Série A players
Campeonato Brasileiro Série B players
Associação Chapecoense de Futebol players